Amorphophallus abyssinicus, also known as Bagana (Sidamo), is a plant of the genus Amorphophallus. It is native to southern Ethiopia, where it is grown in gardens, hence its specific epithet, abyssinicus, derived from Latin and meaning "Abyssinian" or "Ethiopian".

It is cultivated in Gojjam, and the Semien Omo Zone and Konso special woreda of the Southern Nations, Nationalities and Peoples Region, on lands between 1300 and 2000 meters above sea level. The tuberous roots are harvested and cooked for a long time before eating.

Subspecies 
 Amorphophallus abyssinicus subsp. abyssinicus.
 Amorphophallus abyssinicus subsp. akeassii Ittenbach, 1997 
 Amorphophallus abyssinicus subsp. unyikae (Engl. & Gehrm.) Ittenb. ex Govaerts & Frodin, 2002

References

External links 

Abyssinicus
Flora of Ethiopia
Root vegetables
Garden plants of Africa
Plants described in 1901
Taxa named by N. E. Brown
Taxa named by Achille Richard